This article shows the statistical leaders of the Mississippi State Bulldogs women's basketball team. For statistical leaders of the school's men's team, see Mississippi State Bulldogs men's basketball statistical leaders.

The Mississippi State Bulldogs women's basketball statistical leaders are individual statistical leaders of the women's basketball program of Mississippi State University in various categories, including points, three-pointers, assists, blocks, rebounds, and steals. Within those areas, the lists identify single-game, single-season, and career leaders. The Bulldogs represent Mississippi State in the NCAA's Southeastern Conference.

Mississippi State began competing in women's intercollegiate basketball in 1974, These lists are updated through the end of the 2022–23 season.

Scoring

Points scored

Points per game

3-pointers

3-point percentage

Other statistics

Assists

Blocks

Rebounds

Steals

See also
 Football statistical leaders
 Men's basketball statistical leaders

References

Statistical
Lists of college basketball statistical leaders by team